

See also
:Template:Gun politics interest groups in the United States

 
 
Gun politics
Gun politics topics